The State of Burma (Biruma-koku) was a Japanese puppet state created by Japan in 1943 during the Japanese occupation of Burma in World War II.

Background

During the early stages of World War II, the Empire of Japan invaded British Burma primarily to obtain raw materials (which included oil from fields around Yenangyaung, minerals and large surpluses of rice), and to close off the Burma Road, which was a primary link for aid and munitions to the Chinese Nationalist forces of Chiang Kai-shek which had been fighting the Japanese for several years in the Second Sino-Japanese War.

The Japanese Fifteenth Army under Lieutenant General Shojiro Iida quickly overran Burma from January – May 1942. The Japanese had also assisted the formation of the Burma Independence Army (BIA), which aided the Japanese during their invasion. The BIA formed a provisional government in some areas of the country in the spring of 1942, but there were differences within the Japanese leadership over the future of Burma. While Colonel Suzuki encouraged the BIA to form a provisional government, the Japanese military leadership had never formally accepted such a plan and the Japanese government held out only vague promises of independence after the end of the war. However, a Burmese Executive Administration was established in Rangoon on 1 August 1942 with the aim of creating a civil administration to manage day-to-day administrative activities subordinate to the Japanese military administration. The head of the provisional administration was Dr. Ba Maw, a noted lawyer and political prisoner under the British.

National symbols
The State of Burma adopted the nationalist symbols as the State's symbols to persuade nationalists.
 The first version of Burmese Tricolour as the State's flag.
 The Dobama Anthem (de facto anthem of anti-British) as the State's anthem.
 Burmese as the State's official language.

Administrative Divisions
The State of Burma was divided into four Divisions;
 (1) Northern Division
 (2) Western Division
 (3) Southern Division
 (4) Kambawza Division

The Kambawza Division, made up of Shan States and Karenni States, was put under the direct administration of the head of state.

Greater East Asia Co-Prosperity Sphere
As the war situation gradually turned against the Japanese, the Japanese government decided that Burma and the Philippines would become fully independent as part of the Greater East Asia Co-Prosperity Sphere, contrary to the original plan that independence only be granted after the completion of the war.  Japanese Prime Minister  Hideki Tōjō promised that independence for Burma would be granted within a year from 28 January 1943, with the condition that Burma declare war on the United Kingdom and the United States. The Japanese government felt that this would give the Burmese a real stake in an Axis victory in the Second World War, creating resistance against possible re-colonization by the western powers, and increased military and economic support from Burma for the Japanese war effort.

A Burma Independence Preparatory Committee chaired by Ba Maw was formed 8 May 1943 with a wide variety of respected members.  On 1 August 1943, Burma was proclaimed the independent State of Burma and the Japanese military government for Burma was officially dissolved. The new state quickly declared war on the United Kingdom and the United States and concluded a Treaty of Alliance with Japan.

Ba Maw became "Naingandaw Adipadi" (head of state) of Burma under the new constitution, with wide powers.

Government of the State of Burma
The first cabinet of the State of Burma consisted of:
Ba Maw, Prime Minister (in addition to his post as head of state)
General Aung San, Deputy Prime Minister
Ba Win, Minister of Home Affairs
Thakin Nu, Minister of Foreign Affairs
Dr. Thein Maung, Minister of Finance (later replaced by U Set after he was appointed to be Burman ambassador to Japan)
General Aung San, Minister of Defence
Thein Maung, Minister of Justice
Hla Min, Minister of Education and Health
Thakin Than Tun, Minister of Agriculture (later became Minister of Transport)
U Mya, Minister of Commerce and Industry
Thakin Lay Maung, Minister of Communications and Irrigation
Bandula U Sein, Minister of Welfare and Publicity
Tun Aung, Minister of Co-Operation with Japan
Thakin Lun Baw, Public Works Recovery Minister

On 25 September 1943, as promised, Japan ceded all of the Shan states to Burma except for the part east of the Salween River i.e. Kengtung and Mongpan, which had already been given to Thailand. Ba Maw attended the Greater East Asia Conference in Tokyo from 5–6 November 1943.

Though now nominally independent, the power of the State of Burma to exercise its sovereignty was largely circumscribed by wartime agreements with Japan. The Imperial Japanese Army maintained a large presence and continued to act arbitrarily, despite Japan no longer having official control over Burma.

During 1943 and 1944, the Burma National Army made contacts with other political groups inside Burma, including the Communist Party of Burma which had been operating underground. Eventually, a popular front organization called the Anti-Fascist Organisation (AFO) was formed with Thakin Soe as the leader. Through the communists and the Japanese-sponsored Arakan Defence Army, the Burmese were eventually able to make contact with the British Force 136 in India. The initial contacts were always indirect. Force 136 was also able to make contacts with members of the BNA's Karen unit in Rangoon.

In December 1944, the AFO contacted the Allies, indicating their readiness to defect to the Allied cause by launching a national uprising which would include the forces of BNA. However, this was opposed by the British, who considering the timing to be unfavorable, and who had considerable reservations about supporting the BNA. The first BNA-led uprising against the Japanese occurred early in 1945 in central Burma.

On 27 March 1945, the remainder of the BNA paraded in Rangoon and marched out ostensibly to assist the Japanese army in the battles then raging in Central Burma against invading Allied forces. Instead, the BNA openly declared war on the Japanese. Aung San and others subsequently began negotiations with Lord Mountbatten and officially joined the Allies as the Patriotic Burmese Forces. Without the support of the BNA, the government of the State of Burma quickly collapsed, and Ba Maw fled via Thailand to Japan, where he was captured later that year and was held in Sugamo Prison, Tokyo, until 1946.

See also
 Japanese occupation of Burma
 Saharat Thai Doem
 Burma Independence Army

References 

Kady, J (1958). "History of Modern Burma"

 
States and territories disestablished in 1945
 
Former countries in Southeast Asia
Client states of the Empire of Japan
National liberation movements
States and territories established in 1943
South-East Asian theatre of World War II